A miniskirt (sometimes hyphenated as mini-skirt, separated as mini skirt, or sometimes shortened to simply mini) is a skirt with its hemline well above the knees, generally at mid-thigh level, normally no longer than  below the buttocks; and a dress with such a hemline is called a minidress or a miniskirt dress. A micro-miniskirt or microskirt is a miniskirt with its hemline at the upper thigh, at or just below crotch or underwear level.

Short skirts have existed for a long time before they made it into mainstream fashion, though they were generally not called "mini" until they became a fashion trend in the 1960s. Instances of clothing resembling miniskirts have been identified by archaeologists and historians as far back as c. 1390–1370 BC. In the early 20th century, the dancer Josephine Baker's banana skirt that she wore for her mid-1920s performances in the Folies Bergère was subsequently likened to a miniskirt. Extremely short skirts became a staple of 20th-century science fiction, particularly in 1940s pulp artwork, such as that by Earle K. Bergey, who depicted futuristic women in a "stereotyped combination" of metallic miniskirt, bra and boots.

Hemlines were just above the knee in 1961, and gradually climbed upward over the next few years. By 1966, some designs had the hem at the upper thigh. Stockings with suspenders (garters) were not considered practical with miniskirts and were replaced with coloured tights. The popular acceptance of miniskirts peaked in the "Swinging London" of the 1960s, and has continued to be commonplace, particularly among younger women and teenage girls. Before that time, short skirts were only seen in sport and dance clothing, such as skirts worn by female tennis players, figure skaters, cheerleaders, and dancers.

Several designers have been credited with the invention of the 1960s miniskirt, most significantly the London-based designer Mary Quant and the Parisian André Courrèges.

History

History in China 
In the Warring States period of China, men could wear short skirts similar to a kilt. In the Qin dynasty, the first imperial dynasty of China, some short skirts worn by men were short enough to reach the mid-thighs as observed in the Terracotta army of Qin Shihuang. In albums produced during the Qing dynasty (1644–1912) from the early eighteenth century onward to illustrate the various types of Miao, the  women were depicted wearing "mini skirts that barely cover the buttocks." At least one of the "One Hundred Miao Pictures" albums contains a poem that specifically describes how the women's short skirts and navel-baring styles were an identifier for this particular group.

History in Europe and America

Pre-1960s 
Figurines produced by the Vinča culture (c. 5700–4500 BC) have been interpreted by archaeologists as representing women in miniskirt-like garments. One of the oldest surviving garments resembling a miniskirt is the short woollen skirt with bronze ornaments worn by the Egtved Girl for her burial in the Nordic Bronze Age (c. 1390–1370 BCE).

The dancer Josephine Baker's banana skirt that she wore for her mid-1920s performances in the Folies Bergère was subsequently likened to a miniskirt. Prior to the 1960s during the 20th century, any woman who was not a stage performer or showgirl like Josephine Baker or, after the 1920s, any woman who was not an athlete or competitive dancer could not wear skirts above her knees as part of her everyday clothing and be socially accepted. During the 1950s, even the skirts of cheerleaders and many ballerinas fell to the calf. Women were taught to keep their knees covered, to seat themselves in ways that kept the legs together, etc., to avoid being thought sexually promiscuous.

Mid-20th century science fiction 

Extremely short skirts became a staple of 20th-century science fiction, particularly in 1940s pulp artwork such as that by Earle K. Bergey who depicted futuristic women in a "stereotyped combination" of metallic miniskirt, bra and boots. The "sci-fi miniskirt" was seen in genre films and television programmes as well as on comic book covers. The very short skirts worn by regular female characters Carol and Tonga (played by Virginia Hewitt and Nina Bara) in the 1950–55 television series Space Patrol have been suggested as probably the first 'micro-minis' to have been seen on American television. It was later seen as remarkable that only one formal complaint relating to the skirts could be recalled, and that by an ad agency in relation to an upwards shot of Carol climbing a ladder. Hewitt pointed out that even though the complainant claimed they could see up her skirt, her matching tights rendered her effectively clothed from neck to ankle. Otherwise, Space Patrol was applauded for being wholesome and family-friendly, even though the women's short skirts would have been unacceptable in other contexts. Although the 30th-century women in Space Patrol were empowered, experts in their field, and largely treated as equals, "it was the skirts that fuelled indelible memories." The Space Patrol skirts were not the shortest to be broadcast at the time – the German-made American 1954 series Flash Gordon showed Dale Arden (played by Irene Champlin) in an even shorter skirt.

1960s 
The manager of an unnamed shop in London's Oxford Street began experimenting in 1960 with skirt hemlines an inch above the knees of window mannequins, and noted how positively his customers responded. In August 1961, Life published a photograph of two Seattle students at the University of Hawaiʻi wearing above-the-knee garments called "kookie-muus" (an abbreviated version of the traditionally concealing muumuu), and noted a "current teen-age fad for short skirts" that was pushing hemlines well above the knee. The article also showed young fashionable girls in San Francisco wearing hemlines "just above the kneecap" and students at Vanderbilt University wearing "knee ticklers" ending three inches above their knee to play golf in, while the caption commented that such short skirts were selling well in the South, and that "some Atlanta girls" were cutting old skirts to "thigh high" lengths.

Extremely short skirts, some as much as eight inches above the knee, were observed in Britain in the summer of 1962. The young women who wore these short skirts were called "Ya-Ya girls", a term derived from "yeah, yeah" which was a popular catcall at the time. One retailer noted that the fashion for layered net crinoline petticoats raised the hems of short skirts even higher. The earliest known reference to the miniskirt is in a humorous 1962 article datelined Mexico City and describing the "mini-skirt" or "Ya-Ya" as a controversial item of clothing that was the latest thing on the production line there.  The article characterised the miniskirt as stopping eight inches above the knee.  It referred to a writing by a psychiatrist, whose name it did not provide, who had argued that the miniskirt was a youthful protest of international threats to peace.  Much of the article described the reactions of men, who were said to favour the fashion on young women to whom they were unrelated, but to oppose it on their own wives and fiancées.

Only a very few of the avant-garde, almost entirely in the UK, wore such lengths in the beginning years of the decade, however. The standard hemline for public and designer garments in the early sixties was mid-knee, just covering the knee. It would gradually climb upward over the next few years, fully baring the knees of mainstream models in 1964, when both André Courrèges and Mary Quant showed above-the-knee lengths. The following year, skirts continued to rise as British miniskirts were officially introduced to the US in a New York show whose models' thigh-high skirts stopped traffic. By 1966, many designs had the hem at the upper thigh. Stockings with suspenders (American English: "garters") were not considered practical with miniskirts and were replaced with coloured tights. Legs could also be covered with knee-high socks or various heights of boots, lower-calf height in 1964–65, knee-heights throughout the period, over-the-knee and thigh-high boots more 1967–69, and even boot-hose, tights  incorporating a shoe sole and heel to form a waist-high boot, often in stretch vinyl. Sandal straps might crisscross or otherwise rise up the leg, even as high as the thigh, and body paints were offered for a time to add colour to the leg in more individualised ways than wearing tights. Towards the end of the 1960s, an even shorter version, called the microskirt or micro-mini, emerged.

The shape of miniskirts in the 1960s was distinctive. They were not the squeezingly tight skirts designed to show off every curve that 1950s sheath skirts had been, nor were they shortened versions of the tightly belted, petticoat-bolstered 1950s circle skirt. In the 1990s and later, you would occasionally see exhibitions on the sixties present vintage miniskirts pulled in tight against gallery mannequins, but sixties miniskirts were not worn that way. They were not worn tight. Sixties miniskirts were simply-constructed, uninhibiting, slightly flared A-line shapes, with some straight and tapered forms seen in the early years of their existence. This shape was seen as deriving from two forms of the 1950s: (1) the chemise dress/sack dress, attributed to Givenchy in 1957 but presaged by Karl Lagerfeld in 1954 and Mary Quant in 1956, a waistless, tapered column that became the shift dress in the early sixties when it began to be made straight or slightly flared rather than tapered, and (2) the trapeze dresses popularized by Yves Saint Laurent in 1958 that were a variation of Dior's 1955 A-line, both of a geometric triangular shaping. In silhouette, the minidresses of the mid-1960s were basically abbreviated versions of the shift dress and trapeze dress, with Paco Rabanne's famous metal and plastic minidresses of 1966 and '67 following the trapeze line and most of Rudi Gernreich's following the shift line. Mary Quant and other British designers, as well as Betsey Johnson in the US, also showed minidresses that resembled elongated rugby jerseys, body-skimming but not tight. When skirts alone, they tended to sit on the hips rather than holding the waist, called hipster minis if they were really low on the hips. The fashionable forms of the microminis of the later 1960s were also not tight, often looking somewhat tunic-like and in fabrics like Qiana.

In addition, sixties miniskirts were not worn with high heels but with flats or low heels, for a natural stance, a natural stride, and to enhance the fashionable child-like look of the time, seen as a reaction to 1950s come-hither artifice like needle heels, constrained waists, padded busts, and movement-inhibiting skirts. The designer Mary Quant was quoted as saying that "short short skirts" indicated youthfulness, which was seen as desirable, fashion-wise.

In the UK, by shortening the skirts to less than  they were classed as children's garments rather than adult clothes. Children's clothing was not subject to purchase tax whereas adult clothing was. The avoidance of tax meant that the price was correspondingly less.

During the late 1960s, as most skirts got shorter and shorter, designers began presenting a few alternatives. Calf-length midi-skirts were introduced in 1966–67, and floor-length maxi-skirts appeared around the same time, after being seen on hippies first around 1965–66. Like with miniskirts, these were overwhelmingly casual in feel and simply constructed to a two-straight-side-seams A-line shape. Women in the late sixties welcomed these new styles as options but didn't necessarily wear them, feeling societal pressure to shorten their skirts instead.

(Decades later, starting in the late nineties, the term midi-skirt would be expanded to refer to any calf-length skirt from any era, including skirts of that length from the 1930s, 1950s, and 1980s of any shape, and the term maxi-skirt would be expanded to apply to any floor-length skirt from any era, including ballgowns, but that was not the case during a period from the late 1960s to the 1980s, when the term midi-skirt only applied to casual, simply-cut A-line calf-length skirts of the late sixties and earliest seventies and the term maxi-skirt only applied to casual, simply-cut A-line floor-length skirts of the late sixties and earliest seventies. Even the full, calf-length skirts worn from the mid-seventies to the early eighties were not called midi-skirts at the time, as that was by 1974 considered a passė term restricted only to a specific shape of skirt from the late sixties and earliest seventies.)

As designers attempted to require women to switch to midi-skirts in 1969 and 1970, women responded by ignoring them, continuing to wear minis and microminis and, even more, turning to trousers like those endorsed by Yves Saint Laurent in 1968, a trend that would dominate the 1970s.

Designer claims 

Several designers have been credited with the invention of the 1960s miniskirt, most significantly the London-based designer Mary Quant and the Parisian André Courrèges. Although Quant reportedly named the skirt after her favourite make of car, the Mini, there is no consensus as to who designed it first. Valerie Steele has noted that the claim that Quant was first is more convincingly supported by evidence than the equivalent Courrèges claim. However, the contemporary fashion journalist Marit Allen, who edited the influential "Young Ideas" pages for UK Vogue, firmly stated that the British designer John Bates was the first to offer fashionable miniskirts. Other designers, including Pierre Cardin and Yves Saint Laurent, had also been raising hemlines at the same time.

Mary Quant
The miniskirt is one of the garments most widely associated with Mary Quant. Quant herself is ambivalent about the claim that she invented the miniskirt, stating that her customers should take credit, as she herself wore very short skirts, and they requested even shorter hemlines for themselves. Regardless of whether or not Quant invented the miniskirt, it is widely agreed that she was one of its highest-profile champions. Contrary to obvious and popular belief, Quant named the garment after the Mini Cooper, a favourite car of hers, stating that the car and the skirt were both "optimistic, exuberant, young, flirty", and complemented each other.

Quant had started experimenting with shorter skirts in the late 1950s, when she started making her own designs up to stock her boutique on the King's Road. Among her inspirations was the memory of seeing a young tap-dancer wearing a "tiny skirt over thick black tights", influencing her designs for young, active women who did not wish to resemble their mothers. In addition to the miniskirt, Quant is often credited with inventing the coloured and patterned tights that tended to accompany the garment, although their creation is also attributed to the Spanish couturier Cristóbal Balenciaga who offered harlequin-patterned tights in 1962 or to Bates.

In 2009, a Mary Quant minidress was among the 10 British "design classics" featured on a series of Royal Mail stamps, alongside the Tube map, the Spitfire, and the red telephone box.

André Courrèges
Courrèges explicitly claimed that he invented the mini, and accused Quant of only "commercialising" it. He presented short skirts measuring four inches above the knee in January 1965 for that year's Spring/Summer collection, although some sources claim that Courrèges had been designing miniskirts as early as 1961, the year he launched his couture house. The collection, which also included trouser suits and cut-out backs and midriffs, was designed for a new type of athletic, active young woman. Courrèges had presented "above-the-knee" skirts in his August 1964 haute couture presentation which was proclaimed the "best show seen so far" for that season by The New York Times. The Courrèges look, featuring a knit bodystocking with a gabardine miniskirt slung around the hips, was widely copied and plagiarised, much to the designer's chagrin, and it would be 1967 before he again held a press showing for his work. Steele has described Courrèges's work as a "brilliant couture version of youth fashion" whose sophistication far outshone Quant's work, although she champions the Quant claim. Others, such as Jess Cartner-Morley of The Guardian explicitly credit him, rather than Quant, as the miniskirt's creator.

John Bates and others

The idea that John Bates, rather than Quant or Courrèges, innovated the miniskirt had an influential champion in Marit Allen, who as editor of the influential "Young Ideas" pages for UK Vogue, kept track of up-and-coming young designers. In 1966 she chose Bates to design her mini-length wedding outfit in white gabardine and silver PVC. In January 1965 Bates's "skimp dress" with its "short-short skirt" was featured in Vogue, and would later be chosen as the Dress of the Year. Bates was also famous for having designed mini-coats and dresses and other outfits for Emma Peel (played by Diana Rigg) in the TV series The Avengers, although the manufacturers blocked his request for patterned tights to enable Emma Peel to fight in skirts if necessary.

An alternative origin story for the miniskirt came from Barbara Hulanicki of the London boutique Biba, who recalled that in 1966 she received a delivery of stretchy jersey skirts that had shrunk drastically in transit. Much to her surprise, the ten-inch long garments rapidly sold out.

In 1967 Rudi Gernreich was among the first American designers to offer miniskirts, in the face of strongly worded censure and criticism from American couturiers James Galanos and Norman Norell. Criticism of the miniskirt also came from the Paris couturier Coco Chanel, who declared the style "disgusting" despite being herself famed for supporting shorter skirts in the 1920s.

Reception 

Owing to Quant's position in the heart of fashionable "Swinging London", the miniskirt was able to spread beyond a simple street fashion into a major international trend. The style came into prominence when Jean Shrimpton wore a short white shift dress, made by Colin Rolfe, on 30 October 1965 at Derby Day, first day of the annual Melbourne Cup Carnival in Australia, where it caused a sensation. According to Shrimpton, who claimed that the brevity of the skirt was due mainly to Rolfe's having insufficient material, the ensuing controversy was as much as anything to do with her having dispensed with a hat and gloves, seen as essential accessories in such a conservative society.

Upper garments, such as rugby shirts, were sometimes adapted as mini-dresses. With the rise in hemlines, the wearing of tights or pantyhose, in place of stockings, became more common. At the same time, there was some opposition in the US to miniskirts as bad influences on the young, but this waned as people became more accustomed to them. Some European countries  banned mini-skirts from being worn in public, claiming they were an invitation to rapists. In response, Quant retorted that there was clearly no understanding of the tights worn underneath.

The response to the miniskirt was particularly harsh in Africa, where many state governments saw them as an un-African garment and part of the corrupting influence of the West. Young city-dwelling African women who wore Western clothing such as the miniskirt were particularly at risk of attack based on their clothing, although Robert Ross notes that gender roles and politics were also a key factor. The urban woman earning her own living and independence was seen as a threat to masculine authority, particularly if she wore clothing seen as un-African. Short skirts were seen as indicating that their wearer was a prostitute, and by conflation, a witch who drained male-dominated society of its vitality and energy. In addition to prostitutes and witches, miniskirts also became associated with secretaries, schoolgirls and undergraduates, and young women with "sugar daddies" as lovers or boyfriends. Andrew M. Ivaska has noted that these various tropes boiled down to a basic fear of female power, fear that a woman would use her education or sexual power to control men and/or achieve her own independence, and that the miniskirt therefore became a tangible object of these fears.

In 1968 the Youth League of Tanzania's ruling TANU party launched Operation Vijana. Organised and run by young men, Vijana was a morality campaign targeting indecent clothing, which led to attacks on women with at least one stoning reportedly triggered by the victim's miniskirt. Gangs of youths patrolled bus stations and streets looking for women dressed "inappropriately", and dealing out physical attacks and beatings. In Ethiopia, an attack on women wearing miniskirts triggered a riot of leftist students in which a hundred cars were set on fire and fifty people injured.

Kamuzu Banda, president of Malawi, described miniskirts as a "diabolic fashion which must disappear from the country once and for all." It is also reported that Kenneth Kaunda, president of Zambia, cited apartheid and the miniskirt as his two primary hates. By the mid-1970s the Zanzibar revolutionary party had forbidden both women and men from wearing a long list of garments, hairstyles and cosmetics, including miniskirts.

Post-1960s

1970s 
From 1969 onwards, the fashion industry largely returned to longer skirts such as the midi and the maxi, with even Mary Quant showing no above-the-knee skirts for 1970. Journalist Christopher Booker gave two reasons for this reaction: firstly, that "there was almost nowhere else to go ... the mini-skirts could go no higher"; and secondly, in his view, "dressed up in mini-skirts and shiny PVC macs, given such impersonal names as 'dolly birds', girls had been transformed into throwaway plastic objects". This lengthening of hemlines coincided with the growth of the feminist movement.  However, in the 1960s the mini had been regarded as a symbol of liberation, and it was worn by some, such as Germaine Greer and, in the following decade, Gloria Steinem. Greer herself wrote in 1969 that:

In the earliest seventies, 1970 particularly, minis and microminis briefly rebounded in popularity after women's rejection of designers' attempt to impose midiskirts as the sole length in 1970, referred to as "the midi debacle" and more a phenomenon in the US than elsewhere. Women both continued to wear miniskirts and switched even more to trousers, and designers, having been made to understand that they would no longer be respected as arbiters, followed suit for a couple of years and included minis again, often underneath midis and maxis. Prominent designers Rudi Gernreich and André Courrèges never went for midis and continued to show the clothes for which they were known. In 1971, almost all designers, even upper-echelon couture designers, showed hot pants across the board, also presented in combination with midiskirts, maxiskirts, and minis. They continued to express a desire for women to wear longer skirts, though, and soon those women who hadn't switched entirely to jeans and trousers were often wearing their skirts at the knee. In 1973, Kenzo made calf-length skirts look new by cutting them fuller and in lighter fabrics for a style that was very different from the midi and women soon accepted this, making it one of the characteristic styles of the mid-seventies, one that would last into the early eighties, sometimes dropping to the ankle.

Although miniskirts had mostly disappeared from mainstream fashion by the mid-70s, prompting the leading designer of the time, Yves Saint Laurent, to say, "I don't think short skirts will ever come back," they never entirely went away, with women having to be pressured by the fashion industry to abandon above-the-knee skirts as late as 1974 and even some mainstream designers like Halston, Kenzo, and Karl Lagerfeld offering a few mini-tunics and mini-blousons among the standard calf-length dirndl skirts of the mid-seventies Big Look period. In these occasional high-fashion versions of the mid-seventies, mini was taken to mean any length above the knee. These were never broadly taken up by the general public, which was still gravitating toward below-the-knee dirndls, but were occasionally seen on the fashion-forward.

Around 1976, punks began including among their array of clothes intended to shock very short miniskirts in materials like black leather, rubber, PVC, tartan, and even trash bag plastic, the unfashionable length shocking almost as much as the aggressive materials. Punks of this period also introduced the wearing of miniskirts with then-very-out-of-style high-heeled, late-1950s pumps, which they got at thrift shops, a combination not worn in the 1960s and unthinkable during the 1950s. Though not at all mainstream, these punk looks would influence bands that came after them into wearing more sixties-looking miniskirts again, as evidenced by Deborah Harry of the group Blondie, Kate Pierson and Cindy Wilson of the group The B-52's, Fay Fife of The Revillos, Rhoda Dakar of The Bodysnatchers, Siouxsie Sioux of the group Siouxsie And The Banshees, and the group The Slits, who often wore miniskirts during the "new wave" era of the late 70s. Some of these performers were part of a few sixties-revival subcultures that came in the wake of punk and included Mod revival and ska revival, both of whose female adherents sought out authentic-looking early miniskirts as part of their sixties-revival look. Blondie's Deborah Harry had her sixties-ish look provided by fashion designer Stephen Sprouse, who had been responsible for Halston's "skimp" minis of 1974 and would become internationally known for his own sixties-revival line during the eighties. The song "(I Don't Want to Go to) Chelsea" (1978), by new wave artist Elvis Costello, contains the line in the chorus: "There's no place here for the mini-skirt waddle."

During the seventies, when males and females typically wore identical denim cutoff shorts instead of miniskirts if they wanted short lengths, the female cast members of the US TV show Hee Haw, known as the "Hee Haw Honeys", always wore country-style minidresses even during the miniskirt's fashion hiatus in the late 70s and early 80s; and as mentioned above, female tennis players, figure skaters, cheerleaders, and dancers also wore short skirts.

Toward the end of the seventies, in 1978 and '79, some of the above-the-knee skirt looks that would become associated with the eighties began to be introduced, including the flounced, hip-yoked style debuted by Norma Kamali and Perry Ellis in 1979 and called rah-rah skirts in the UK and the tight, above-the-knee sheath skirt, with even Yves Saint Laurent showing some above-the-knee lengths. The sixties-revival subcultures emanating from the UK seemed to reach the high fashion world somewhat in 1979, as a few Paris catwalks presented styles for spring 1980 seemingly pulled right out of the sixties, including miniskirts inspired by Courrèges, Rabanne, and Gernreich. At this point, these styles were still considered avant-garde, though, and a variety of mostly longer skirts were worn by the public, with the full, calf-length forms that had dominated the mid-seventies still prevalent but beginning to be made slimmer, slightly shorter, more brightly coloured, and often slit. The mainstream return of the miniskirt wouldn't come until the 1980s.

1980s and 1990s 
Miniskirts returned to mainstream acceptance in the 1980s, but with some differences from the 1960s:

Because women had worn skirts that covered the knee and often dropped to the calf for so many years during the 1970s, any skirt above the knee was often called a miniskirt in the late seventies and early eighties, even skirts that hit just above the knee.

They weren't presented this time as the only length women should wear. They were now just one option among a variety of lengths and styles of skirts and pants available to women, and miniskirts tended to be in the minority among all the other kinds of skirts and pants seen on the streets, particularly in the early part of the decade. Throughout the decade, street lengths ranged from ankle to thigh, for both skirts and trousers, and most women wore their skirts just below the knee, as they also had in the seventies.

Miniskirts came in a greater variety of shapes than in the sixties, from full and flouncy to narrow to tight to abbreviated revivals of skirt shapes of the 1940s and '50s like sheath skirts, trumpet skirts, tulip skirts, and bubble/puffball skirts. Above-the-knee versions of strapless 1950s dresses were seen, as were formal minis with bustles and trains in the back. Even tutus were shown mid-decade. Many above-the-knee dresses had noticeable shoulder pads.

They were worn with a greater range of heel heights than in the sixties, depending on the shape of the miniskirt, with flats preferred for some styles and high-heeled pumps preferred for others. In the early part of the decade, opaque tights, sometimes brightly coloured, and flat, calf-high boots might be worn with the more casual styles, much like in the mid-sixties. Throughout the period, dressier styles with high heels tended to be worn with hose ranging from slightly tinted to opaque. A punk influence was sometimes seen when miniskirts were paired with combat boots or Doc Martens.

In the early eighties, miniskirts were still considered avant-garde and unusual among the public, though designers had begun showing them again in 1979 and had begun shortening some skirts to just above the knee in 1978. Some minis from 1979 and '80 were modeled after sweatshirts. Others were lifted straight out of the Space Age mid-sixties. Some were inspired by punk.

The most influential designer of miniskirts in the early eighties was probably Norma Kamali. In 1980, she introduced sweatshirt-fabric versions of the flounced, hip-yoked, above-the-knee skirts she had first presented in 1979, called rah-rah skirts in the UK. In 1981 and '82, miniskirts from this "Sweats" line would reach mainstream levels of popularity and make Kamali a household name.

In the spring of 1982 (as featured in the June issue of Time Magazine that year), short skirts began to re-emerge more strongly among the public, notably in the form of "rah-rahs", which were modeled on those worn by female cheerleaders at sporting and other events.

By 1983, miniskirts had become more widespread, with both Kamali-style full versions and slim, straight versions in jean-cut blue denim commonly worn, as well as other styles.

Kenzo had been almost the only designer to champion miniskirts during their nadir in the mid-seventies, and he was vindicated in the eighties as several of the miniskirt styles he had shown back then were taken up by other designers.

Yves Saint Laurent had believed short skirts would never return in the mid-seventies, but he led the move to above-the-knee skirts starting in 1978 and during the first half of the eighties was known for his slim, black leather miniskirts.

Karl Lagerfeld had begun showing miniskirts at the end of the seventies and in 1983 would take over the house of Chanel, where he soon began adding minis and microminis to the offerings, a surprise because Chanel herself had hated 1960s miniskirts, considering the knees to be an ugly part of the body.

Sixties-revivalist Stephen Sprouse showed his first collection in 1983 and favored almost period-perfect shift minidresses and trapeze minidresses in graffiti prints, blacks, and searing sixties brights, including fluorescents, with geometric paillettes and sixties-style cutouts, sometimes of peace signs. Unlike in the sixties, though, he showed these clothes with eighties shoe shapes like high-heeled pumps and Doc Martens.

A style that would be seen off and on throughout the decade but would become almost ubiquitous in the second half of the eighties was the tight, stretch minidress worn with high-heeled eighties pumps and often padded shoulders. In silhouette, this was sort of an abbreviated, less heavily constructed version of 1950s sheath skirts, which brings up another difference between 1960s minis and some of these forms of tight, blatantly seductive 1980s minis: they were shown on bodies that were voluptuous and/or muscular instead of thin and child-like as in the sixties.

Throughout the 1980s, beginning at the end of the seventies, designers experimented with shortening heavily constructed historical dress styles, mostly from the 1950s, with fifties crinoline skirts, fifties sheath skirts, and fifties bubble/puffball skirts shown in above-the-knee lengths as early as 1979. Styles from the deeper past were also shortened. For 1981, Perry Ellis added stuffed-organdy padding to the hips of the flouncy, hip-yoked miniskirts he'd been showing for a couple years and referred to them as farthingales, a sixteenth-century term for a similarly padded floor-length skirt. A far more influential example of a truncated historical skirt style came from former punk designer Vivienne Westwood. In 1985, British designer Westwood offered her first "mini-crini," an abbreviated version of the Victorian crinoline. Its mini-length, bouffant silhouette inspired the puffball skirts widely presented by more established designers such as Christian Lacroix. In 1989, Westwood's mini-crini was described as having combined two conflicting ideals – the crinoline, representing a "mythology of restriction and encumbrance in woman's dress", and the "equally dubious mythology of liberation" associated with the miniskirt.

In the mid-1980s, Azzedine Alaïa began presenting mini and micromini versions of his extremely tight dress designs, his anatomical seaming and occasional sheer fabrics creating a prurient effect that would never have been seen in sixties miniskirts. His miniskirts, though, also included some that resembled flippy skating skirts and others that were grass-like raffia so short they barely covered the wearer. His earlier fitted, curve-accenting skirts, usually in a just-above-the-knee length that sometimes rose to the lower thigh, would be very influential in the second half of the decade, spawning imitations by companies like North Beach Leather and Body Glove.

During the mid- to late eighties, Patrick Kelly put his own whimsical signature on the familiar, high-heel-accompanied, tight, stretch minidresses of the decade, covering them with bright buttons, bright bowties, cartoon faces, etc.

For fall of 1987 and spring of '88, designers united in presenting a great proportion of miniskirts in almost all collections, with very few mainstream designers bucking the trend. Though a few designers showed these minis in somewhat sixties shapes with flat shoes or boots, most showed truncated versions of the eighties suits and cocktail dresses. They were themselves revivals of 1940s and '50s styles, with slightly narrower shoulders and worn with high-heeled over-the-knee boots or high-heeled eighties pumps that looked like ones from the late fifties/early sixties. Dark hose were recommended for them. Many of the new minis were stretch-fit tight, and some were very short, with Ungaro's so brief they were likened to 1950s bathing suits. The fashion industry's miniskirt campaign was so intense that newspaper articles appeared on women considering plastic surgery on their knees to suit the new lengths.

However, though there was a rush on miniskirts for a time, the unanimity around mini lengths didn't last long, as women continued to consider minis just one option among the many available during the decade and didn't replace their entire wardrobes with them as they had in the sixties. This 1987-88 miniskirt push, though, would help cement the mini's status as a basic item in the average woman's wardrobe for many years to come.

From the 1980s, many women began to incorporate the miniskirt into their business attire, a trend which grew during the remainder of the century. The titular character of the 1990s television program Ally McBeal, a lawyer portrayed by Calista Flockhart, has been credited with popularising micro-skirts.

The very short skirt is an element of Japanese school uniform, which since the 1990s has been exploited by young women who are part of the kogal (or gyaru) subculture as part of their look.

2000s and 2010s 
In the early 2000s, micro-minis were once again revived. In 2003, Tom Ford, at that time described as one of the few designers able to effortlessly dictate changes in fashion, stated that micro-skirts would be the height of fashion for Spring/Summer 2003. For fashionable wear, early 21st century microskirts were often worn with leggings or tights in order to avoid revealing too much. At this time, an even briefer version of the micro-mini emerged, creating a garment sometimes described as a "belt-skirt".

A BBC article in 2014 wrote that miniskirts remained as contemporary a garment as ever, retaining their associations with youth. In an early 2010s study the department store Debenhams found that women continued buying miniskirts up to the age of 40, whilst 1983 studies showed that 33 years old was when the average woman had stopped buying them. Debenham's report concluded that by the 2020s, miniskirts would be seen as a wardrobe staple for British women in their 40s and early 50s.

Despite this, in the early 21st century, miniskirts are still seen as controversial, and remain subject to bans and regulation. Valerie Steele told the BBC in 2014 that even though miniskirts no longer had the power to shock in most Western cultures, she would hesitate to wear one in most parts of the world. She described the garment as symbolic of looking forward to future freedom and backwards to a "much more restricted past" and noted that international rises in extreme conservatism and religious fundamentalism had led to an anti-women backlash, some of which was shown through censure and criticism of women wearing "immodest" clothing. In 2010, the mayor of Castellammare di Stabia in Italy ordered that police fine women for wearing "very short" miniskirts. In the 2000s, a ban on miniskirts at a teacher's college in Kemerovo was claimed by lawyers to be against the terms of equality and human rights as laid out by the Russian constitution, whilst in Chile, the women's minister, Carolina Schmidt, described a regional governor's ban on public employees wearing minis and strapless tops as "absolute nonsense" and challenged their right to regulate other people's clothing. In July 2010, Southampton city council also tried to regulate their female employees's wardrobes, telling them to avoid miniskirts and dress "appropriately."

Miniskirts regularly appear in Africa as part of controversies, something that has continued since the 1960s. In the early 21st century alone, instances have included a proposed ban on miniskirts in Uganda justified by claiming that they were a dangerous distraction to drivers and would cause road accidents, and in 2004, a leaflet campaign in Mombasa instructed women to dress modestly and "shun miniskirts", leading to the Kenyan government denying that they wanted a ban. Since the 1990s, women perceived to be "indecently dressed" might be stripped in public often by gangs of men, but sometimes by other women. These acts took place in Kenya, Zambia and elsewhere, including incidents in Johannesburg in 2008 and 2011 which led to similar attacks in various states including Sudan, Malawi, Zimbabwe and elsewhere. The President of Malawi, Bingu wa Mutharika, was forced to make a statement in 2012 after male gangs forcibly stripped women in Lilongwe and Mzuzu. By this point, "miniskirt protests" regularly followed these acts of violence, with the protesters defiantly wearing miniskirts. In late February 2010, a group of about 200 Ugandan women demonstrated against a so-called "miniskirt law", an anti-pornography legislation which specifically forbade women to dress  "in a manner designed to sexually excite", or from wearing clothing that revealed their thighs and/or other body parts. Uganda revisited their proposed ban in 2013, with Simon Lokodo, Minister of Ethics and Integrity, proposing another anti-pornography bill which would outlaw revealing "intimate parts", defined as "anything above the knee", and vowing that women who wore miniskirts would be arrested. While most of these proposed bans come from male politicians, in 2009 Joice Mujuru, Zimbabwe's vice president, had to deal with rumours that she intended to ban miniskirts and trousers for women. In Africa, one of the main issues with the miniskirt since the 1960s is that it is seen as representative of protest against predominantly male authority, an accusation also applied to trousers for women which are perceived as blurring the gender divide.

See also
Hotpants

References

 Sources

External links

 

1960s fads and trends
1960s fashion
1960s neologisms
1970s fashion
1980s fashion
1990s fashion
2000s fashion
2010s fashion
Articles containing video clips
History of fashion
Skirts
Women's clothing